The 2012 SWAC men's basketball tournament will take place March 7–10 at the Garland Special Events Center in Garland, Texas.   The winner of the tournament will receive the Southwestern Athletic Conference's automatic bid to the 2012 NCAA tournament.

Format
Eight teams will qualify for the tournament. Southern and Grambling each received one-year postseason bans in men’s basketball, thus not allowed to participate in the 2012 SWAC Tournament, due to failing to meet the NCAA's Academic Progress Rate requirements.  The rest of the seeds will be determined after the final games are played

Bracket

References

SWAC men's basketball tournament
2011–12 Southwestern Athletic Conference men's basketball season